Elizabeth McClure (born 1957) is a New Zealand based glass artist who was born in Lanark, Scotland.

McClure was formally educated at the Edinburgh College of Art receiving a Diploma in Art (Glass Design) in 1979 and a Post Graduate Diploma in 1980. McClure has lived, taught and exhibited internationally in Japan, UK, USA, Australasia and Iceland.  After completing her studies, McCLure worked at a number of UK glassmakers and from 1985-6 McClure taught glass design in Japan. During the 1990s McClure lectured at Auckland's UNITEC and between 2005-9 was the MFA studio supervisor at Whitecilff College of Art, Auckland. Between 1991-93 McClure held the presidents position of Ausglass, an example of her involvement within the contemporary glass movement. Helen Schamroth writes, 'McClure's glass reflects her diverse background, and reveals a broad vocabulary of skills including blowing and casting'.

Recognition
2000–1: Inaugural Thomas Foundation Award The Dowse Art Museum, Lower Hutt NZ
1996–7: Awarded fellowship to the Creative Glass Centre of America for 3-month residency
1996: Awarded glass prize, NZ Glass and Ceramic Awards, Artex Art XPO, Auckland
1995: Awarded Toi Aotearoa Arts Council Grant

Selected exhibitions
2013 Auckland Art Fair represented by FHE Galleries, Auckland
2013 Wheaton Glass: The Art of the Fellowship Creative Glass Centre of America’s 
2013 LANDSCAPE: Masters of Glass Sabbia Gallery, Sydney, Australia
2012 From Pupil to Master Solomon Fine Art Gallery, Dublin, Ireland
2007 The Scots in New Zealand Museum of New Zealand Te Papa Tongarewa Wellington
2004 Southern Exposure: NZ Glass Survey Ebeltoft Glass Museum, Denmark
1999 The Best of New Zealand Glass Axia Modern Gallery, Melbourne, Australia
1998 Pacific Light: International Movements in Glass Auckland Museum 
1996 Venezia Aperto Vetro Museo Correr, Venice, Italy
1994 Little Jewels James Cook Hotel, Wellington
1993 World Glass Now Museum of Modern Art, Sapporo, Hokkaido, Japan

References

External links
Elizabeth McClure in the collection of the Museum of New Zealand Te Papa Tongarewa
Elizabeth McClure in the collection of Auckland Museum

1957 births
New Zealand glass artists
New Zealand educators
Living people
Alumni of the Edinburgh College of Art
Women glass artists